The following is a comparison of the features of notable shopping cart software packages available. Some such shopping cart software is extensible through third-party software components and applications. As such, the features listed below may not encompass all possible features for a given software package. The software listed here is but a fraction of all such packages on the market.

General information
Basic information about the shopping carts including creator, software license and framework, and updates.

Systems listed on a light purple background are no longer in active development.

Data storage
Information about what data storage system can be used.

General features
Information about the features the shopping carts offer.

Customer features
Information about the features the shopping carts offer.

Customer reward features
Information about the features the shopping carts offer.

Administration area features
Information about the features the shopping carts offer.

Search engine optimization features
Information about the features the shopping carts offer.

Security features
Information about the features the shopping carts offer.

Other features
Information about the features the shopping carts offer.

Payment gateway support
Information about which payment gateways are supported.

Alternative checkout support
Information about which alternative checkouts are supported.

Real-time shipping calculation
Information about if shopping carts have real-time shipping calculation built-in to allow calculating how much it will cost to ship an order in real time when the customer checks out an order.

Shipment booking integration
Information about if shopping carts have shipment booking integration to allow staff to be able to book shipments for a number of orders at once via the control panel.

Shipment tracking integration
Information about if shopping carts have shipment tracking integration to show the customers the tracking information on the "View order" pages.

See also

E-commerce
Online shopping
Types of E-commerce

References

Network software comparisons
E-commerce software